The 2013 Nielsen Pro Tennis Championship was a professional tennis tournament played on hard courts. It was the 22nd edition of the tournament which was part of the 2013 ATP Challenger Tour. It took place in Winnetka, Illinois, between 1 and 7 July 2013.

Singles main-draw entrants

Seeds

 1 Rankings are as of June 24, 2013.

Other entrants
The following players received wildcards into the singles main draw:
  Jarmere Jenkins
  Evan King
  Dennis Nevolo
  Jack Sock

The following players received entry as an alternate into the singles main draw:
  Eric Quigley
  Michael McClune
  Ante Pavić

The following players received entry from the qualifying draw:
  Sekou Bangoura
  Jeff Dadamo
  Kevin King
  Mārtiņš Podžus

Champions

Singles

 Jack Sock def.  Bradley Klahn 6–4, 6–2

Doubles

 Yuki Bhambri /  Michael Venus  def.  Somdev Devvarman /  Jack Sock 2–6, 6–2, [10–8]

External links
Official website

Nielsen Pro Tennis Championship
Nielsen Pro Tennis Championship
Niel
Nielsen Pro Tennis Championship
Nielsen Pro Tennis Championship